Baptist Theological Seminary (founded in 1882) is a Baptist seminary of the Convention of Baptist Churches of Northern Circars (CBCNC) located in Jagannaickpur, Church Square, Kakinada in Kakinada district of Andhra Pradesh, India.  The seminary was affiliated to nation's first University, the Senate of Serampore College (University) in 1949.

History 
The Seminary was founded in Samalkot in 1882 by the Canadian Baptist Mission, under the stewardship of the John McLaurin. In 1912, the Seminary was shifted from Samalkot to Kakinada.  However, in 1920, the Seminary closed and was merged with the Ramayapatnam Baptist Theological Seminary and a joint faculty comprising the American Baptists and the Canadian Baptists began taking classes.  In 1928, the Seminary was reopened in Kakinada and the faculty were recalled from Ramayapatnam.

In 1964 the Seminary moved to Rajahmundry in the campus of the Lutheran Theological Seminary.  With the formation of the ecumenical seminary – Andhra Christian Theological College in 1964, the B.Th. and B.D. classes were moved in 1964 to it while the Seminary retained the stand-alone diploma courses.

In the beginning, the seminary was affiliated to the Senate of Serampore College (University).  However, with the formation of the Andhra Christian Theological College (ACTC) in 1964, the seminary began sending its students for Bachelor of Theology and Bachelor of Divinity to ACTC. After the formation of ACTC, an ecumenical seminary in Rajahmundry in 1964, the BTS got itself amalgamated into it in 1964 for Senate approved courses. However, the BTS began offering self-managed and operated Graduate of Theology courses under the seal of the Seminary Council since then. The BTS was upgraded from  S. Th to B. Th from August 2015 onwards

Members of Faculty

Present (Resident and Visiting)
 The Rev. N. Leela Grace, CBCNC, Faculty member,
 The Rev. B. Devasahayam, CBCNC, Faculty member,
 The Rev. B. Theophilus, CBCNC, Faculty member,
 The Rev. Vara Joseph Deepak Raj Kumar, CBCNC, Faculty member,
 The Rev. K. Ranjit Kumar, CBCNC, Faculty member and Principal,
 The Rev. P. V. Raja Babu, CBCNC, Faculty member

Past

Resident
 Prof. M. Theophilus, CBCNC,
 The Rev. B. Arjuna Rao, CBCNC,
 The Rev. T. Theophilus, CBCNC,
 The Rev. G. Noah Raju, CBCNC,
 The Rev. G. S. Albert Ezekiel, CBCNC,
 The Rev. K. P. Israel, CBCNC,
 The Rev. I. Samuel, CBCNC,
 The Rev. C. L. Timpany, CBM
 The Rev. J. I. Richardson, CBM

Visiting
 The Rev. K. David, CBCNC,
 The Rev. G. Babu Rao, CBCNC,
 The Rev. D. J. Jeremiah, CBCNC,
 The Rev. K. D. G. Prakasa Rao, CBCNC,
 The Rev. Paul Carter, CBM

Succession of Seminary Principals

See also
 Eva Rose York Bible Training and Technical School for Women, Tuni
 Canadian Baptist Ministries, Canada
 Convention of Baptist Churches of Northern Circars
 Andhra Christian Theological College, Secunderabad, Andhra Pradesh
 Senate of Serampore College (University), Serampore, West Bengal

References
Notes

Further reading

External links
 Official site of the Canadian Baptist Ministries

Christian seminaries and theological colleges in India
Colleges in Andhra Pradesh
Universities and colleges in Kakinada district
Convention of Baptist Churches of Northern Circars
Educational institutions established in 1882
Canadian Baptist Ministries
1882 establishments in India
Kakinada